Kun-woo, also spelled Keon-woo or Gun-woo, is a Korean masculine given name. It was the sixth-most popular name for baby boys born in South Korea in 2008, with 1,722 being given the name. The meaning differs based on the hanja used to write the name. There are 15 hanja with the reading "kun" and 42 hanja with the reading "woo" on the South Korean government's official list of hanja which may be used in given names.

People with this name include:
Kun-Woo Paik (born 1946), South Korean pianist
Kim Kun-woo (born 1980), South Korean track and field athlete
Park Gun-woo (sailor) (born 1981), South Korean Olympic sailing team member
Cho Gun-woo (born 1988), South Korean badminton player
Lee Gun-woo (born 1989), South Korean singer and actor, member of boy band Myname
Park Keon-woo (born 1991), South Korean track cyclist

Fictional characters with this name include:
Kang Gun-woo, in 2008 South Korean television series Beethoven Virus
Min Gun-woo, in 2008 South Korean television series Temptation of Wife

See also
List of Korean given names

References

Korean masculine given names